Rick Kline is an American sound engineer. He has been nominated for eleven Academy Awards in the category Best Sound. He has worked on more than 220 films since 1978.

Selected filmography
 Terms of Endearment (1983)
 Silverado (1985)
 Top Gun (1986)
 Mississippi Burning (1988)
 Days of Thunder (1990)
 A Few Good Men (1992)
 Crimson Tide (1995)
 Air Force One (1997)
 The Mummy (1999)
 U-571 (2000)
 Memoirs of a Geisha (2005)

References

External links

Year of birth missing (living people)
Living people
American audio engineers
Best Sound BAFTA Award winners